Annie Wersching (March 28, 1977 – January 29, 2023) was an American actress. She was known for her television roles as Renee Walker in 24, Julia Brasher in Bosch, and Emma Whitmore in Timeless, as well as the voice and performance-capture for Tess in the video game The Last of Us.

Early life
Wersching was born in St. Louis, Missouri, on March 28, 1977. She attended Crossroads College Preparatory School in St. Louis, graduating in 1995. During her youth, she competed in Irish dance and belonged to the St. Louis Celtic Stepdancers group. She received a BFA in musical theatre from Millikin University, from which she graduated in 1999.

Career

Wersching began her acting career with a guest appearance on the show Star Trek: Enterprise and moved on to guest starring roles on such shows as Angel, Charmed, Cold Case, Killer Instinct and Supernatural. From March to November 2007, she played the recurring role of Amelia Joffe on the ABC soap opera General Hospital. She also worked in theaters such as Victory Gardens, Marriott Lincolnshire, and the Utah Shakespearean Festival.

Wersching played FBI Special Agent Renee Walker in the seventh and eighth seasons of 24.

After her two-season stint in 24, Wersching guest starred on various shows, including CSI, NCIS, Rizzoli & Isles, Hawaii Five-0, Body of Proof, Dallas, Revolution, Castle, Blue Bloods, The Vampire Diaries, and Touch.

Wersching played in the 2009 Taco Bell All-Star Legends and Celebrity Softball Game. 

In December 2012, it was revealed that in the PlayStation 3 exclusive The Last of Us, Wersching was the voice and motion-capture actor of the character Tess. Her character was teased on Geoff Keighley's Twitter account before she was finally revealed in the story trailer shown on Spike Video Game Awards on December 7, 2012.

In 2014, she was a series regular for the first season of the Amazon Prime crime show Bosch. In 2022, Wersching played the Borg Queen in the second season of Star Trek: Picard.

Personal life
Wersching married actor and comedian Stephen Full at their Los Angeles home in September 2009. They had three sons together.

Death
Wersching was diagnosed with cancer in mid-2020, though she kept her diagnosis private and continued to act afterward. She died in Los Angeles, California, on January 29, 2023, at age 45.

Filmography

Film

Television

Video games

References

External links
 
 
 

1977 births
2023 deaths
American soap opera actresses
American television actresses
Actresses from St. Louis
21st-century American actresses
American film actresses
American voice actresses
American video game actresses
Millikin University alumni
Crossroads College Preparatory School alumni
Deaths from cancer in California